Blue Jeans or jeans usually means jeans; a type of pants, typically made from denim or dungaree cloth.

Blue Jeans may also refer to:

Films

 Blue Jeans (1917 film), based on the 1890 play
 Blue Jeans (1975 film) starring Gloria Guida

Songs

 "Blue Jeans" (Blur song)
 "Blue Jeans" (1920s song)
 "Blue Jeans" (Sqeezer song)
 "Blue Jeans" (Skyhooks song), 1976
 "Blue Jeans" (Ladytron song)
 "Blue Jeans" (Lana Del Rey song)
 "Blue Jeans", a 2002 song by Yasmeen Sulieman
 "Blue Jeans", a 2015 song by Chris Brown from Royalty

Other

 Blue Jeans (play), an 1890 American play by Joseph Arthur
 BlueJeans Network, a video-conferencing system
 Blue Jeans (magazine), a UK teen magazine
 Blue Jeans, a Spanish writer.

See also
 "Blue Jean Blues" – a 1975 song by ZZ Top from the album Fandango!
 "Blue Jean", a 1984 song by David Bowie
 Bob B. Soxx & the Blue Jeans
 "Forever in Blue Jeans", a 1979 a song by Neil Diamond
 Jeans (disambiguation)